Manoj Kanti Deb  is an Indian politician from Tripura. He was the Minister of Food, civil supplies and consumer affairs, and now holds the Urban Development, in the Manik Saha's ministry.

He joined the Bharatiya Janata Party in 2017 after leaving National Congress. He became the MLA from Kamalpur Constituency by defeating CPI(M) candidate Bijoy Laxmi Singha by a margin of 2,959 votes.

References 

Year of birth missing (living people)
Living people
Tripura politicians
State cabinet ministers of Tripura
Bharatiya Janata Party politicians from Tripura
Tripura MLAs 2018–2023